Sometimes may refer to:

Music

Albums
 Sometimes (Bill Anderson and Mary Lou Turner album) or the title song (see below), 1976
 Sometimes (City and Colour album) or the title song, "Sometimes (I Wish)", 2005
 Sometimes (Facts of Life album) or the title song, 1977
 Sometimes, by Thomas Knak, 2003

Songs
 "Sometimes" (Ash song), 2001
 "Sometimes" (Bill Anderson song), 1975
 "Sometimes" (Brand New Heavies song), 1997
 "Sometimes" (Britney Spears song), 1999
 "Sometimes" (Clay Davidson song), 2001
 "Sometimes" (Cub Sport song), 2018
 "Sometimes" (Donkeyboy song), 2009
 "Sometimes" (Erasure song), 1986
 "Sometimes" (Kodaline song), 2020
 "Sometimes" (Max Q song), 1989
 "Sometimes" (Miami Horror song), 2009
 "Sometimes" (Midnight Oil song), 1987
 "Sometimes" (Stranglers song), 1977
 "Sometimes", by After the Fire from Der Kommissar, 1982
 "Sometimes", by Angie Stone from The Art of Love & War, 2007
 "Sometimes", by Ariana Grande from Dangerous Woman, 2016
 "Sometimes", by Badfinger from Straight Up, 1971
 "Sometimes", by Blind Melon from For My Friends, 2008
 "Sometimes", by Blink-182 from Buddha, 1994
 "Sometimes", by Candlebox from Happy Pills, 1998
 "Sometimes", by the Carpenters from Carpenters, 1971
 "Sometimes", by Crush from Crush on You, 2014
 "Sometimes", by DallasK, 2019
 "Sometimes", by Depeche Mode from Black Celebration, 1986
 "Sometimes", by Donna Williams, 2000
 "Sometimes", by Earshot from The Silver Lining, 2008
 "Sometimes", by Firehose from If'n, 1987
 "Sometimes", by Garbage from Strange Little Birds, 2016
 "Sometimes", by Gerry Cinnamon from Erratic Cinematic, 2017
 "Sometimes", by Gucci Mane from Trap Back, 2012
 "Sometimes", by  H.E.R., 2020
 "Sometimes", by Hanson from MMMBop, 1996
 "Sometimes", by Hooverphonic from Hooverphonic Presents Jackie Cane, 2002
 "Sometimes", by James from Laid, 1993
 "Sometimes", by K. Michelle from Rebellious Soul, 2013
 "Sometimes", by Kat Graham, 2017
 "Sometimes", by Les Rythmes Digitales from Darkdancer, 1999
 "Sometimes", by Lo'99 featuring Owl Eyes, 2019
 "Sometimes", by Matt Brouwer from Where's Our Revolution, 2009
 "Sometimes", by Michael Franti & Spearhead from Stay Human, 2001
 "Sometimes", by My Bloody Valentine from Loveless, 1991
 "Sometimes", by Natalie Imbruglia from Left of the Middle, 1997
 "Sometimes", by Neiked, 2019
 "Sometimes", by No Doubt from No Doubt, 1992
 "Sometimes", by Orchestral Manoeuvres in the Dark from History of Modern, 2010
 "Sometimes", by Papa Roach from Getting Away with Murder, 2004
 "Sometimes", by Pearl Jam from No Code, 1996
 "Sometimes", by Punch, 2019
 "Sometimes", by Punch Brothers from Punch, 2008
 "Sometimes", by Reamonn from Wish, 2006
 "Sometimes", by Ringo Starr from Vertical Man, 1998
 "Sometimes", by Sound of Guns, 2012
 "Sometimes", by Sunny Day Real Estate from Diary, 1994
 "Sometimes...", by Tyler, the Creator from Flower Boy, 2017
 "Sometimes (Dr. Hirsch)", by Yello from Stella, 1985

Other uses
 Sometimes (film), a 2018 Indian film
 "Sometimes" (This Is Us), a television episode
 "Sometimes", a poem by Sheenagh Pugh

See also
 Sometime (disambiguation)